La Vern E. Weber (September 3, 1923 – December 30, 1999) was a United States Army officer who served as Adjutant General of Oklahoma, Director of the Army National Guard and Chief of the National Guard Bureau (NGB).  He was the first NGB Chief to hold the rank of lieutenant general.

Early life
La Vern Erick Weber was born in Lone Wolf, Oklahoma, on September 3, 1923.  He attended the University of Oklahoma and Louisiana Tech University, where he played football before leaving in 1942 to enlist for World War II.

Originally part of the navy's V-12 program, he received a commission in the Marine Corps upon completing Officer Candidate School in 1945.  He served in the Marine Corps Reserve until 1948.

He graduated from Oklahoma's East Central State College (now East Central University) with a Bachelor of Science degree in education in 1948, and then joined the Oklahoma National Guard as a second lieutenant.  In addition to maintaining a farm, he worked as a teacher and coach.

Korean War
In 1950, Weber was mobilized with the 45th Infantry Division for the Korean War.  He served as operations and training officer (S3) of the 2nd Battalion, 180th Infantry Regiment.

Post-war
Weber returned to Oklahoma in 1952 and was assigned as operations and training officer for the 179th Infantry Regiment.  In 1955, he graduated from the United States Army Command and General Staff College and was assigned as intelligence officer (G2) of the 45th Infantry Division.

In 1961 Weber became the 45th Division's personnel staff officer (G1), and in 1964 he was appointed division chief of staff, receiving a promotion to colonel.
In 1965 Weber was appointed adjutant general by Governor Henry Bellmon and promoted to brigadier general and then major general.

National Guard Bureau
In 1971, Weber was appointed director of the Army National Guard.

In 1974, he was appointed Chief of the National Guard Bureau, and Charles A. Ott Jr. succeeded Weber as director of the Army National Guard.
In 1979, he was promoted to lieutenant general.

FORSCOM

Weber served as deputy commander for mobilization and readiness at United States Army Forces Command (FORSCOM) and executive officer of the Reserve Forces Policy Board (RFPB) from 1982 until retiring in 1984.

Awards and decorations
Weber's awards included the:

 Army Distinguished Service Medal
 Legion of Merit
 Marine Corps Good Conduct Medal
 Selected Marine Corps Reserve Medal
 Army of Occupation Medal
 American Campaign Medal
 World War II Victory Medal
 National Defense Service Medal with bronze star
 Armed Forces Reserve Medal with silver hourglass device
 Korean Service Medal
 United Nations Service Medal
 Republic of Korea Presidential Unit Citation

Post-military career
After retiring from the military, Weber was appointed executive director of the National Guard Association of the United States, and he served until 1993.

Retirement and death
In retirement, Weber lived on a farm near Perry, Oklahoma.

He died there on December 30, 1999, as the result of injuries sustained when fence panels he was preparing to install fell on him. Weber was buried in the Oklahoma Veterans Cemetery in Oklahoma City.

Legacy
The National Guard Professional Education Center (NGPEC) at Camp Joseph T. Robinson, Arkansas, is named for him.

References

External links
 Oklahoma Historical Society, Encyclopedia of Oklahoma History & Culture, Weber, La Vern Erick, accessed April 10, 2013
 La Vern E. Weber at Find A Grave

1923 births
1999 deaths
United States Army generals
National Guard (United States) generals
Chiefs of the National Guard Bureau
United States Marine Corps personnel of World War II
United States Army personnel of the Korean War
United States Army Command and General Staff College alumni
Recipients of the Distinguished Service Medal (US Army)
Recipients of the Air Force Distinguished Service Medal
Recipients of the Legion of Merit
Louisiana Tech Bulldogs football players
East Central University alumni
People from Lone Wolf, Oklahoma
People from Perry, Oklahoma